Yermolino may refer to:
Yermolino Urban Settlement, a municipal formation which the town of Yermolino in Borovsky District of Kaluga Oblast, Russia is incorporated as
Yermolino (inhabited locality), several inhabited localities in Russia
Yermolino Airport (ICAO: UUWE), an airport in Kaluga Oblast, Russia